Kurtulus Öztürk (born 7 April 1980) is a retired professional footballer. Born in Germany, he represented Turkey internationally.

Playing career
Öztürk began his footballing careers with the youth academy of Borussia Dortmund. He then joined Adanaspor on loan in the Turkish Süper Lig, where he was coached by Joachim Löw. He spent most of his career in the amateur leagues of Germany before retiring in 2013. He then started working as a manager for his hometown club Werner FC.

References

External links
 
 
 
 
 FuPa Profile
 Sport.de Profile

Living people
1980 births
People from Werne
Sportspeople from Arnsberg (region)
Turkish footballers
Turkish football managers
Turkey youth international footballers
German footballers
German football managers
German people of Turkish descent
Association football fullbacks
Adanaspor footballers
Diyarbakırspor footballers
Borussia Dortmund II players
FC Gütersloh 2000 players
SV Lippstadt 08 players
SC Preußen Münster players
1. FC Kleve players
SC Verl players
Hammer SpVg players
Süper Lig players
TFF First League players
Regionalliga players
Footballers from North Rhine-Westphalia